Crow Island Airport (also known as Crow Island Airpark) is a private airport along the Assabet River in Stow, Massachusetts, United States. It has a 2,300 foot grass airstrip which is popular with "pilots flying a variety of aircraft including, trikes, ultralights, vintage taildraggers, seaplanes, hang gliders, powered paragliders, powered parachutes, RC aircraft and more."

Crow Island had previously been used for a gravel business operated by George Morey. In 1978 Rob Albright, an ultralight enthusiast, received permission to fly at the island, and he eventually purchased and redeveloped the land for full-time use as a small airport.

References

External links 
 Airport website

Stow, Massachusetts
Airports in Middlesex County, Massachusetts